Mewali (Village ID 124909) is an Indian village in Jagner block in  Agra district. According to the 2011 census it has a population of 2333 living in 390 households.

References

Villages in Agra district